Alastor is a Palearctic, Indomalayan and Afrotropical genus of potter wasps, primarily found in tropical Africa. It is divided into the 4 subgenera Alastor, Alastorellus, Megalastor and Parastalor.

Species

 A. abditus
 A. (Alastor) aeger Giordani Soika, 1983
 A. aegyptiacus
 A. afghanicus
 A. albocinctus
 A. algeriensis
 A. angulicollis
 A. anomalus
 A. antigae
 A. arabicus
 A. ardens
 A. arnoldi
 A. asiaticus
 A. atropos Lepeltier, 1841
 A. baidoensis
 A. biegelebeni
 A. bilamellatus
 A. bilaminatus
 A. bispinosus
 A. braunsi
 A. (Alastor) brevicornis Selis, 2020
 A. bucida
 A. bulgaricus
 A. (Alastor) carens Selis, 2020
 A. carinulatus
 A. chrysocephalus
 A. concitatus
 A. conicus
 A. cylindricus
 A. dalyi
 A. darius
 A. elisaei
 A. esfandiarii
 A. exornatus
 A. facilis
 A. faustus
 A. festae
 A. gestroi
 A. (Alastor) gestroides Selis, 2020
 A. globosus
 A. guichardi
 A. harterti
 A. heymonsi
 A. iconius
 A. incospicuus
 A. iranus
 A. kochi
 A. korbi
 A. kuehlhorni
 A. lateritius
 A. lucida
 A. madecassus
 A. mandibularis
 A. maroccanus
 A. mediomaculatus
 A. merceti
 A. micra
 A. minutepunctatus
 A. mocsaryi
 A. (Alastor) moody Selis, 2020
 A. muticoides
 A. muticus
 A. (Alastor) namibiensis Selis, 2020
 A. nigroflavus
 A. nitens
 A. olivieri
 A. pannonicus
 A. paraguayensis
 A. (Alastor) parilis Selis, 2020
 A. pentheri
 A. persimilis
 A. (Alastorellus) planipunctus Selis, 2020
 A. plicatus
 A. possibilis
 A. problematicus
 A. procax
 A. promontorii
 A. promotori
 A. pronotalis
 A. punjabensis
 A. quadraticollis
 A. ricae
 A. rubripes
 A. ruficornis
 A. (Alastor) sabrinae Selis, 2020
 A. sanctus
 A. savignyi
 A. schinzii
 A. schulthessianus
 A. schwarzi
 A. seidenstueckeri
 A. similis
 A. simillimus
 A. slevini
 A. specularis
 A. stevensoni
 A. submissus
 A. sulcatus
 A. sulcifer
 A. (Alastor) temperatus Selis, 2020
 A. thymbrinus
 A. turneri
 A. variolosus
 A. xerxes
 A. zoroaster

References

Biological pest control wasps
Taxa named by Amédée Louis Michel le Peletier
Potter wasps